Lothar Matthes (born 23 July 1947) is a German former diver who competed in the 1968 Summer Olympics and in the 1972 Summer Olympics.

References

1947 births
Living people
German male divers
Olympic divers of East Germany
Divers at the 1968 Summer Olympics
Divers at the 1972 Summer Olympics
20th-century German people